Cetostoma regani, the Pink flabby whalefish, is a species of flabby whalefish found in the ocean depths down to .  This species grows to a length of  SL.

References
 

Cetomimidae
Taxa named by Erich Zugmayer
Fish described in 1914